Jan Pahechan is a 1950 Hindi-language film directed by Fali Mistry, and starring Raj Kapoor and Nargis in lead roles, with Jeevan, Shama Dulari, Neelam and Sankatha in supporting roles. The producers are Robin Chatterjee and Fali Mistry. The film's music was composed by Manna Dey (as Mana Dey), Cecil Mendoza and Khemchand Prakash. The film was based on a story written by Ramanand Sagar and R.P. Sharma.

Plot 
Asha is a very poor woman from a village who is living with her mother and blind father. When her mother dies, her father marries another woman named Rukmani who is very abusive to Asha. Rukmani wants Asha to marry an old villager named Lallu, but her plan fails. Meanwhile, an artist named Anil comes to the village to stay with his friend Jeevan. Anil and Asha fall in love but their affair is kept secret. Later Asha becomes pregnant. Anil suffers from an accident when he returns from his hometown after seeing his dying father. Anil is reluctant to meet Asha as his face gets disfigured in the accident. In order to save Asha from being shamed, Jeevan takes responsibility for Asha's pregnancy. Later Asha returns and meets Anil again.

Cast 
Nargis as Asha
Raj Kapoor as Anil
Jeevan as Jeevan
Shama Dulari
Neelam
Amar
Sankatha Prashad
Amir Banoo
Mukri as Lallu

Soundtrack

References

External links 

1950s Hindi-language films
1950 films
Indian romantic drama films
1950 romantic drama films
Indian black-and-white films
Films directed by Fali Mistry